Mosul Eyalet was an eyalet of the Ottoman Empire. The eyalet was largely inhabited by Kurds.

History
Sultan Selim I defeated the army of Shah Ismail at the Battle of Çaldiran, but it wasn't until 1517 that Ottoman armies gained control of Mosul, which remained a frontier garrison city until the 1534 capture of Baghdad. The eyalet was established in 1535. Mosul then became one of three Ottoman administrative territorial units of ‘Irāk. In the 1840s, the Sanjak of Cizre, which before was a part of the Emirate of Bohtan in the Diyarbekir Eyalet, was added to the Mosul Eyalet, which led to an unsuccessful Kurdish revolt against the Ottoman Empire, led by Bedir Khan Beg.

Administrative divisions
Sanjaks of Mosul Eyalet in the 17th century:
 Sanjak of Bajwanli
 Sanjak of Tekrit
 Sanjak of Eski Mosul (Nineveh)
 Sanjak of Harú
Added in the 1840s
Sanjak of Cizre

See also
Jalili dynasty, rulers of the Mosul Eyalet from 1726 to 1834. 
List of Emirs of Mosul
 Timeline of Mosul

References

Eyalets of the Ottoman Empire in Asia
Ottoman Iraq
1535 establishments in the Ottoman Empire
1864 disestablishments in the Ottoman Empire